Terry Winter may refer to:
 Terry Winter (televangelist)
 Terry Winter (singer)
 Terence Winter, American television and film writer and producer

See also
 Terry Winters, American painter